Vincent Warren Franklin (born 3 November 1966) is an English actor from Haworth, Keighley, Bradford, West Yorkshire, England. He is best known for his roles in comedy television programmes. He has appeared in a number of feature films including the Mike Leigh films Topsy-Turvy (1999), Vera Drake (2004) and Mr Turner (2014), and the 2006 films Confetti and The Illusionist, as well as The Bourne Identity (2002). In 2018, he played the role of Mike Travis in the BBC television series Bodyguard.

Early life
Franklin was born in Haworth, and was raised there until the age of 9 when his family moved to Kilnsea, East Riding of Yorkshire. A couple of years later they moved back to the City of Bradford when Franklin was 11. Franklin was educated at Bradford Grammar School. Franklin studied from 1988 to 1990 at the Bristol Old Vic Theatre School.

Career
Franklin has had roles in many TV series including Five Days, Doc Martin, Being Human, Grandma's House, Happy Valley as DSI Andy Shepherd, as Rowan the trainer in The Office, Nick Jowett in Twenty Twelve, PR guru Stewart Pearson in The Thick Of It, Henry Best in Cucumber and Banana as well as Prendergast in the BBC 2017 adaptation of the Evelyn Waugh novel Decline and Fall. He portrayed Christopher Drawlight in the 2015 BBC production of Jonathan Strange and Mr. Norrell.

He is also a founder of the communications consultancy, Quietroom.

Personal life
Franklin is married to actress Hilary Greatorex and they have two children. He is a Bradford City A.F.C. fan.

Filmography

Film

Television

References

External links

English male television actors
English male film actors
English male stage actors
Alumni of Bristol Old Vic Theatre School
Living people
1966 births